Tezu Airport  is a regional airport serving Tezu, Arunachal Pradesh, India. It is operated by the Airports Authority of India (AAI), which upgraded it to handle ATR-72 aircraft with night-landing facility. Prime Minister Narendra Modi inaugurated the upgraded airport on 9 February 2019. Scheduled commercial flights commenced from 19 August 2021.

History 

Tezu was one of five airports that were shortlisted in 2015 for the implementation of AAI's "no-frills model", which will provide only essential services needed to operationalise the airport, without compromising on safety and security in any way. With an aim to ensure low cost of operation, the airport was to have no conveyor belts, no aerobridges and only the security hold area for departing passengers was likely to be air-conditioned.

On 22 September 2017, a test flight landed on the runway after the airport was upgraded.

On 9 February 2019, Prime Minister of India, Narendra Modi, inaugurated the upgraded airport.

Facilities 

The airport has a 1500 metres runway, terminal building of 4200 square meter area, air traffic control tower, boundary walls, parking lot and drainage system, etc.

Scheduled commercial operation 

Guwahati-Tezu-Guwahati scheduled commercial domestic flights operation commenced from 19 August 2021. The flight which takes 1 hour each way is operated by the FlyBig. This will boost the tourism in the region. Tezu is covered under the UDAN scheme. 

Tezu is also an AGL of Indian Military. Other nearby airports include Pasighat Airport, Zero Airport,  
Walong AGL, Itanagar Airport, etc.

Airlines and destinations

Statistics

See also

 Tourism in Northeast India
 List of AGLs of India
 List of airports in India

References

External links
 Tezu Airport at AAI

Airports in Arunachal Pradesh
Lohit district
Airports with year of establishment missing